Charles Atlas (born Angelo Siciliano; October 30, 1892 – December 24, 1972) was an Italian-born American bodybuilder best remembered as the developer of a bodybuilding method and its associated exercise program which spawned a landmark advertising campaign featuring his name and likeness; it has been described as one of the longest-lasting and most memorable ad campaigns of all time.

Atlas trained himself to develop his body from that of a "scrawny weakling", eventually becoming the most popular bodybuilder of his day. He took the name "Charles Atlas" after a friend told him that he resembled the statue of Atlas on top of a hotel in Coney Island and legally changed his name in 1922. He marketed his first bodybuilding course with health and fitness writer Frederick Tilney in November 1922. The duo ran the company out of Tilney's home for the first six months. In 1929, Tilney sold his half of the business to advertising man Charles P. Roman and moved to Florida. Charles Atlas Ltd. was founded in 1929 and, as of 2023, continues to market a fitness program for the "97-pound weakling" (44 kg). The company is now owned by Jeffrey C. Hogue.

History

Angelo Siciliano was born in Acri, Cosenza, on October 30, 1892. Angelino, as he was also called, moved to Brooklyn, New York, in 1904, and eventually became a leather worker. He tried many forms of exercise initially, using weights, pulley-style resistance, and gymnastic-style calisthenics. Atlas claimed that they did not build his body. He was inspired by other fitness and health advocates who preceded him, including world-renowned strongman Eugen Sandow and Bernarr MacFadden (a major proponent of "physical culture"). He was too poor to join the local YMCA, so he watched how exercises were performed, then performed them at home. He attended the strongman shows at Coney Island, and would question the strongmen about their diets and exercise regimens after the show. He would read Physical Culture magazine for further information on health, strength, and physical development, and finally developed his own system of exercises that was later called "Dynamic Tension", a phrase coined by Charles Roman.

A bully kicked sand into Siciliano's face at a beach when he was a youth, according to the story that he always told. At this time in his life, also according to the story, he weighed only . According to several stories and claims, he was at the zoo watching a lion stretch when he thought to himself, "Does this old gentleman have any barbells, any exercisers? ... And it came over me. ... He's been pitting one muscle against another!" None of the exercises in the Dynamic Tension course could be attributed to how lions use their bodies. Other exercise courses of the time contained exercises similar to Atlas's course, particularly those marketed by Bernarr McFadden and Earle E. Liederman.

Bernarr MacFadden, publisher of the magazine Physical Culture, dubbed Siciliano "America's Most Handsome Man" in 1921, and "America's Most Perfectly Developed Man" in a 1922 contest held in Madison Square Garden. He soon took the role of strongman in the Coney Island circus side show. Atlas never actually won a title anywhere proclaiming him to be the "world's most perfectly developed man".

In 1922, 30-year-old Siciliano officially changed his name to "Charles Atlas" as it sounded much more American. He met Frederick Tilney, a British homeopathic physician and course writer who was employed as publisher Bernarr MacFadden's "ideas man". Atlas and Tilney met through MacFadden, who was using Atlas as a model for a short movie titled The Road to Health. Atlas wrote a fitness course and then asked Tilney to edit it. Tilney agreed and Atlas went into business in 1922.

Dynamic Tension program

Atlas' "Dynamic Tension" program consists of twelve lessons and one final perpetual lesson. Each lesson is supplemented with photos of Atlas demonstrating the exercises. Atlas' lesson booklets added commentary that referred to the readers as his friends and gave them an open invitation to write him letters to update him on their progress and stories. Among the people who took Atlas' course were Max Baer, heavyweight boxing champion from 1934 to 1935; Rocky Marciano, heavyweight boxing champion from 1952 to 1956; Joe Louis, heavyweight boxing champion from 1937 to 1949; British heavyweight weightlifting champion and Darth Vader actor David Prowse; and Allan Wells, the 1980 Moscow Olympic Games 100 meter champion.

Artists' model

Besides photographs, Atlas posed for many statues throughout his life. These included Alexander Stirling Calder's Washington at Peace (1917–18) on the Washington Square Arch, Manhattan; Pietro Montana's Dawn of Glory (1924) in Highland Park, Brooklyn (sometimes misreported as Prospect Park); and James Earle Frazer's Alexander Hamilton (1923) at the U.S. Treasury Building in Washington, D.C.

Death
Atlas began to experience chest pains after exercising during his final years, resulting in his hospitalization in December 1972. He died from a heart attack in the hospital on December 24, 1972, in Long Beach, New York at age 80. He left behind a son, Charles Jr., and a daughter, Diana. His wife, Margaret, had died seven years before. Nunziato Siciliano, Atlas' father, who had returned to Italy shortly after arriving in the US in 1903, lived into his 90s. Atlas' son, Charles Jr., died in August 2008 at the age of 89.

The print advertisements
 The famous Charles Atlas print advertisements became iconic mostly because they were printed in cartoon form from the 1930s on, and in many comic books from the 1940s onwards – in fact continuing long after Atlas' death. The typical scenario, usually expressed in comic strip form, presented a skinny young man (usually accompanied by a female companion) being threatened by a bully. The bully pushes down the "97-pound weakling" and the girlfriend joins in the derision. The young man goes home, gets angry (usually demonstrated by his kicking a chair), and sends away for the free Atlas book. Shortly thereafter, the newly muscled hero returns to the place of his original victimization, seeks out the bully, and beats him up. He is rewarded by the swift return of his girlfriend and the admiration of onlookers.

The ad was said to be based on an experience the real Atlas had as a boy. With variations, it was a mainstay of comic books and boys' magazines for decades. The ads usually conclude with the words "As is true of all the exercises in Atlas's course, you can do these exercises almost anywhere."

Charles Atlas slogans used in advertising copyrighted in 1932 included "Battle Fought in Bed that made Fred a He-Man!", "Insult that Made a Man out of Mac", and "Let Me Give You a Body that Men Respect and Women Admire!". Slogans copyrighted the following year included "97 pound weakling... Who became the World's Most Perfectly Developed Man",  and "Just Seven Days that's All I Need".

"The Insult that Made a Man out of Mac"
In this, the full-length version, the protagonist, "Mac", is accosted on the beach by a sand-kicking bully while his date watches. Humiliated, the young man goes home and, after kicking a chair and gambling a three-cent stamp, subscribes to Atlas's "Dynamic-Tension" program. Later, the now muscular protagonist goes back to the beach and beats up the bully, becoming the "hero of the beach". His girl returns while other women marvel at how big his muscles are. (An earlier but otherwise almost identical version, "How Joe's Body Brought Him Fame Instead of Shame", debuted in the 1940s.)

"The Insult That Turned a 'Chump' Into a Champ"
In this version, which debuted in 1941, "Joe" is at a fair with his girl when the bully (who has just shown his strength with the "Ring-the-Bell" game) insults and pushes him. Joe goes home, slams his fist on the table, and orders the free Atlas book. Joe then returns to the fair, rings the bell, and pushes down the bully while his girlfriend reappears to compliment him on his new, powerful physique.

"Hey, Skinny! Yer Ribs Are Showing!"
The condensed, four-panel version stars "Joe", though it is otherwise identical to Mac's story. Instead of "Hero of the beach", the words floating above Joe's head are "What a man!"

"How Jack the Weakling Slaughtered the Dance-Floor Hog"
Another version of the ad presents a scenario in which "Jack" is dancing with his girl, Helen. They are bumped into by a bully, who comments on how puny Jack is, not even worth beating up. Jack goes home, kicks a chair, and sends away for Atlas's "free book". Later, the muscular Jack finds the bully, punches him, and wins back the admiration of Helen. This time, the words "Hit of the party" float over his head as he basks in the admiration of the other dancers.

In popular culture

Literature

 In the 1966 postmodern novel Beautiful Losers, written by Leonard Cohen, Charles Atlas is parodied as "Charles Axis".
 The short story "Charles Atlas Also Dies" by Sergio Ramírez centers on the main character, a follower of Atlas's exercise program, and his trip to the United States to meet Charles Atlas himself; written from an ironic and dark-humored perspective. Among the numerous references to Atlas's program/story/advertisements, the main character describes having sand kicked in his face by "two big hefty guys" in front of his girlfriend and later being compared to the mythological god Atlas after undergoing the program. The story juxtaposes the superhuman strength and notoriety of Charles Atlas—the symbol, with the fragile and mortal aspects of Charles Atlas—the man. The story begins with the quote: "Charles Atlas swears that sand story is true. — Edwin Pope, The Miami Herald".
 In Kurt Vonnegut's novel Cat's Cradle, Charles Atlas is mentioned. When the narrator comes across the term "Dynamic Tension" in a book about the mysterious cult leader Bokonon, he laughs because he imagines the author does not know "that the term was one vulgarised by Charles Atlas, a mail-order muscle-builder." However, as he reads on he finds that Bokonon is an alumnus of Atlas's training program, which has inspired his idea that "good societies could be built only by pitting good against evil, and by keeping the tension between the two high at all times."
 In Charles Bukowski's short story "Bop Bop Against That Curtain", part of the 1973 volume South of No North, the main characters, a bunch of kids, tried Charles Atlas' Dynamic Tension program to look tough, but they prefer lifting weights as it seems to them "the more rugged and obvious way".
 In Michael Connelly's early Harry Bosch books (The Black Echo, The Black Ice, The Concrete Blonde, The Last Coyote), Bosch's Commanding Officer, Lieutenant Harvey Pounds, is nicknamed "98" as a reference probably both to Charles Atlas's "97 pound weakling" and The Rocky Horror Picture Show.
 A Spitting Image annual parodies the Charles Atlas advertisement as "Charles Einstein", with the two protagonists competing not on muscular physique, but with their rhetorical skills and grasp of postmodernism.

Film and TV
 In the 1978 Vietnam war film The Boys in Company C, Marine Vinnie Fazio complains during a forced march that he is carrying too much ammunition and gear for the platoon, shouting out "What am I?  Charles Atlas?".
 In the Futurama episode "When Aliens Attack", Fry gets sand kicked in his face by a "professional beach bully" who asks for payment for his services after Fry has won the girl, Leela. Leela hits on the bully, but the bully claims to be gay.
 In an episode of Johnny Bravo, Johnny explains that he achieved his muscular physique through the "Flex Bigarms" course, a parody of Atlas.
 The title song of the 1964 film Muscle Beach Party features the lyric "Cherry little woodies are the center of attention / Til the muscle men start the dynamic tension"
 In the 1985 film Pee-wee's Big Adventure, Pee-wee steps on a "Guess Your Weight and Fortune" arcade scale at home, where he weighs in at 98 lbs (and receives a fortune warning him not to leave the house). In the DVD commentary, star Paul Reubens and director Tim Burton point out during the scene that Pee-wee truly is a "98-lb. weakling."
 In the Ren and Stimpy episode "Ren's Pecs", Ren seeks counsel from the bodybuilder "Charles Globe", who inspires him to get plastic surgery. Charles Globe and the entire episode are obvious spoofs of the Charles Atlas story.
In the Seinfeld episode "The English Patient", the character of Izzy Mandelbaum is said to have worked out with Charles Atlas in the '50s to which Jerry wryly replies, "1850s?", poking fun at Izzy's age.
The Rocky Horror Picture Show (film, 1975), makes several references to Atlas:
In "Charles Atlas Song / I Can Make You a Man":
 The title line exploits the grammatical ambiguity of Atlas's slogan "In just seven days, I can make you a man", between the meanings "... cause you to become a 'real' man" and "... create a man for you."
 Both Charles Atlas and "Dynamic-Tension" are mentioned by name.
 It refers to a 98-pound weakling, a reference to Atlas' "97-pound weakling."
 The second line refers to the Charles Atlas advertising campaign with "Will get sand in his face when kicked to the ground."
 The mad-scientist character (Dr. Frank N. Furter) claims that his Frankensteinian creation "carries the Charles Atlas Seal of Approval."
 In an episode of That '70s Show, Eric's sister accuses him of being weak by saying he ordered a Charles Atlas video to buff up.
 In an episode of Monty Python's Flying Circus, Terry Gilliam creates an animation which is a visual spoof of Charles Atlas' ad campaign.
 In an episode of Punky Brewster, Punky asks Henry if he still has his Charles Atlas books after being bullied at school.
 In "Mild Mannered", an episode of Warehouse 13, a pair of Charles Atlas's trunks imbue a character with superhuman powers, including superstrength and the ability to alter his own density.
 In "The Missing Page", an episode of Hancock's Half Hour, Hancock reads the fictional detective novel 'Lady, Don't Fall Backwards'. The final page has been removed, and Hancock reads the lines 'Men! Are you skinny?! Do you have sand kicked in your face?!', a parody of Atlas' advertising in pulp novels.
 In an episode of the television show, What's My Line?, in 1956. Charles Atlas was the mystery guest, calling himself Mr. X.
 In an episode of the television show, Red Dwarf, season 3, episode 4, called "Bodyswap", Rimmer claims Lister was no Charles Atlas to begin with. They had previously swapped bodies so that Rimmer could make Listers body fit. Instead, he abused the trust.
 Robot Chicken has a sketch wherein a weakling gets sand kicked in his face by a bully. He then gets a shot of "Barry McGuire's Super Happy Fun Time Anger Go Go Juice" which turns him into a huge muscleman and he tears the bully in two.
 In the closing segment of Creepshow, after noticing that the voodoo doll ad from the discarded comic book has already been clipped out, one of the garbage collectors starts reading the next ad aloud: "Tired of getting sand kicked in your face..."
 "The Triangle", a season two episode of The Waltons which first aired in 1973, features Jim Bob secretly purchasing and later reading and practicing the exercises in a Charles Atlas' exercise manual in order to win the heart of a female classmate who favors a bigger and stronger boy.
 In the movie Dead Poets Society, Professor Keating (played by Robin Williams) describes his less-than-intellectual youth by saying "I was the intellectual equivalent of a 98-pound weakling. I would go to the beach and people would kick copies of Byron in my face".
 In the movie Motherless Brooklyn the Ed Norton character and Ethan Suplee are sitting in the front seat of a car reading a wrestling magazine.  A Charles Atlas ad is shown on the back cover.
 In the 2020 Netflix mini-series Hollywood season 1, episode 2, Charles Atlas is referenced as an aspirational figure for Rock Hudson by his agent Henry Willson.
 In episode 11, series 5 of the drama series, Billions, Charles Rhoades Senior uses Atlas to make a point about strength during a discussion with his son, Chuck.
 In season 2, episode 2, of The Marvelous Mrs. Maisel, Mrs. Maisel makes a joke during one of her stand up comedy sets comparing the male comedians who preceded her on stage to the "before picture in a Charles Atlas male virility enhancement ad".

Music
The song "Sand in My Face" by 10cc, on their debut album, is a detailed description of Atlas's legendary ads.
The band AFI have a song called "Charles Atlas" on their album Very Proud of Ya.
The Bonzo Dog Doo-Dah Band song "Mr Apollo" is a parody that includes the lines "Five years ago I was a four-stone apology ... Today I am two separate gorillas!"
The Darling Pet Munkee song "Charles Atlas (Hey Skinny...Yer Ribs Are Showing!)" is specifically about the Atlas ads.
The Bob Dylan unreleased song "She's Your Lover Now" from 1965 contains the lyric: "Why must I fall into this sadness? / Do I look like Charles Atlas? / Do you think I still got what you still got, baby?"
 The Faces song "On the Beach" contains the line "though I may not be no Charlie Atlas, / Gonna take my shirt off anyway."
The Australian band The Fauves had a minor local hit with their song "The Charles Atlas Way."
 The Josef K song "Sorry For Laughing" (made popular in the U.S. by Propaganda) contains the line "when we grooved on into town / Charles Atlas stopped to frown / cause he's not made like me and you"
"We Are The Champions" by Queen includes the line, "I've had my share of sand kicked in my face..."
The Who song "I Can't Reach You", on the album The Who Sell Out, is preceded by a "commercial" for the Charles Atlas Course. ("The Charles Atlas course with "Dynamic Tension" can turn you into a beast of a man.") John Entwistle poses on the cover as a panther skin-clad Charles Atlas alumnus, as the more muscular Roger Daltrey was otherwise occupied in a bathtub filled with baked beans. (After this photo session Daltrey caught pneumonia through the beans being ice cold at the end of the shoot.)
 Roger Waters' song "Sunset Strip" from his album Radio K.A.O.S., contains the line "I like riding in my Uncle's car / Down to the beach where the pretty girls all parade / And movie stars and paparazzi play the Charles Atlas kicking-sand-in-the-face game."
In the song "I Will Not Fall" by Wiretrain/Wire, these lyrics appear: "And Charles Atlas Stands, upon the beach, upon his head and says ... I will not fall."
The Statler Brothers song "Do You Remember These" contains the line "Charles Atlas course, Roy Rogers' horse, and 'only the Shadow knows'..."
The Rocky Horror Picture Show song "I Can Make You a Man" references both "Charles Atlas" and "dynamic tension."
Gama Bomb CD titled "Tales From The Grave in Space" features a booklet in which several graphics with song lyrics were designed to resemble Charles Atlas'ads'..."
The My Bloody Valentine song "Another Rainy Saturday" includes the lines "So face up it's not for me, some dumb Charles Atlas fantasy, but you can kick sand in my face if you want to."

Art
 The artist David Hockney, included a print entitled 'The Seven Stone Weakling' in his 1961-3 series, The Rake's Progress.

Magazine and newspapers
 A Canberra Times cartoon features the athletic Tony Abbott having his comeuppance against policy heavyweight Kevin Rudd.
 An issue of Nickelodeon Magazine features a fake advertisement that parodies the Atlas body ads; the difference is that the product promises to make a person extremely smart. In this parody, a genius man picks on an incredibly strong yet slow-witted man for his lack of intelligence. The man gets his revenge by scientifically proving that the genius bully does not exist, making him disappear.
 An article in The Onion spinoff Our Dumb Century portrays a feud between Adlai Stevenson and General William Westmoreland being carried out in the same vein as illustrated in the Charles Atlas advertisement.
 A 1993 Entertainment Weekly video review of the films Hard Target and Last Action Hero depicted Jean-Claude Van Damme as the bully on the beach and Arnold Schwarzenegger as the weakling. In the illustration, Van Damme harasses a scrawny Schwarzenegger, claiming that Hard Target, unlike Schwarzenegger's movie, was well-received by both audiences and critics. Instead of ordering Atlas's program, Schwarzenegger calls his agent and orders Last Action Hero to be released on video immediately. Schwarzenegger, now with a film doing well as a video rental (despite its theatrical failure), returns to the beach and punches Van Damme out.

Comics
In an issue of the DC Comics title Mystery in Space, the main character, Comet, referring to an army of super-powered clones, says, "Physically those clones may make me look like a 98-pound-weakling, but psychically I'm the Charles Atlas of this beach".
The January 1974 issue of the satiric magazine National Lampoon was dedicated to animals: Pets, circus, wild beasts, evolution, law, etc. A fake advertisement in the article 'Popular Evolution', a parody of the magazine Popular Mechanics, presents in the three-stage comic strip manner a Charles Atlas-style commercial. A little skinny mouse suffers the humiliation of being kicked at the beach by a bully, some sort or medium-size carnivore. Little mouse, goes home, kicks a chair, fills the form and sends it to Mr. Charles Darwin, Galapagos Islands. "After a few millions years of evolutionary exercise" little mouse has developed fangs, and ugly scary face, wings, amongst other attributes; goes back to the beach, bites the bully predator in the neck, Count Dracula style and is declared the "heroe of the habitat" by the admiring females. Unfortunately the issue is out of print and cannot be seen online anywhere.
The "kicking sand in the face" image has been used many times in Archie comics.
Flex Mentallo is a comic book character created by writer Grant Morrison and artist Richard Case in 1990, during their run on Doom Patrol. Flex is in part a parody of Charles Atlas' long-running "The Insult that made a Man out of Mac" advertisements seen in American comics from the past.
2000AD featured The insult that made a robot of 'Walt''', featuring Droid Atlas and Walter the Wobot
Marvel Comics' humor series What The--?! used Atlas parodies regularly, as in "The Insult that Made Mac a Blood-Sucking Freak!" (What The--?! #23, November 1992).
Minicomics pioneer Matt Feazell uses the sand-kicking bully to represent the Etruscan attack on Rome in Not Available Comics #25, 1993.
"The Hold-Up that Made a Hero Out of Mac", from Radioactive Man #1 (Bongo Comics, 1993), blends Mac's story with Batman's origin.
Cartoonist Chris Ware appropriated Mac's "chair-kicking resolve" in a Jimmy Corrigan story from Acme Novelty Library #1 (Fantagraphics, Winter 1993).
Cartoonist Josh Neufeld used the ad to spoof business writer David A. Vise in a piece done for Fortune Small Business magazine in 2002.
In the June 4, 2007, edition of This Modern World, Tom Tomorrow uses the ad to make a point about how President George W. Bush pushes around Congressional Democrats.
New Orleans cartoonist Caesar Meadows spoofed the ad—substituting zine-making for bodybuilding—while advertising the 2008 Alternative Media Expo.The Strange Talent of Luther Strode by Justin Jordan and Tradd Moore features a dark parody of Atlas's Dynamic Tension regimen, one which bestows superhuman strength, durability and reflexes, but at the cost of gaining an aggressive nature and seeing people as their musculature.
One chapter of manga Ranma ½ has minor antagonist Hikaru Gosunkugi buy a suit of powered armor from a parody of the "Beach Bully" advertisements. While it does make him stronger, it comes with a couple of drawbacks: it renders him immobile if he is not chained to a person he hates, and it self-destructs if he is unable to knock out the person he is chained to.

Video games
In early versions of the game, The Secret of Monkey Island, there was a statue in a voodoo shop that when inspected would make the character say "Looks like an emaciated Charles Atlas." The reference has since been removed due to Lucasfilm Games receiving a cease and desist letter.
Video game developer Valve released an update to their popular game, Team Fortress 2 that gave the sniper class a jar of urine called "Jarate". The comic strip that Valve used to advertise the update is a parody of the strip "The Insult that Made a Man out of Mac". A later update that introduced the ability for players to give and receive high fives was promoted with similar comic strip, this time spoofing the strip "Hey, Skinny! Yer Ribs Are Showing!"
The physically unimposing "Little Mac" character in Mike Tyson's Punch-Out!! and the Punch-Out!! franchise is named in homage to the "Mac" of Atlas' best-known comic-book advertisement.
The game Kingdom of Loathing'' contains a reference to the sand-kicking campaign.

References

External links

 
 

1892 births
1972 deaths
Advertising campaigns
American bodybuilders
American exercise and fitness writers
Burials at St. John's Cemetery (Queens)
Italian emigrants to the United States
People from the Province of Cosenza
Sideshow performers
Strength training writers
People of Calabrian descent
American artists' models
People associated with physical culture